Filip Lazarov (born 21 April 1985) is a retired Macedonian handball player and current coach of SG Ratingen 2011.

Filip is the younger brother of Kiril Lazarov.

Trophies 
Macedonian Champions 
Metalurg (4) 2006, 2008, 2010, 2011
Vardar (3) 2013, 2015, 2016
Macedonian Cup 
Metalurg (4) 2006, 2009, 2010, 2011
Vardar (4) 2012, 2014, 2015, 2016
Macedonian SEHA  
Vardar (2) 2012, 2014
Turkish Champions 
Beşiktaş (2) 2017, 2018
Turkish Cup  
Beşiktaş (2) 2017, 2018
Turkish Super Cup  
Beşiktaş (2) 2017, 2018

References

Macedonian male handball players
1985 births
Living people
Sportspeople from Veles, North Macedonia
Macedonian expatriate sportspeople in Germany
Macedonian expatriate sportspeople in Hungary
Macedonian expatriate sportspeople in Romania
Macedonian expatriate sportspeople in Turkey
Expatriate handball players in Turkey
Beşiktaş J.K. Handball Team players
RK Vardar players
People from Sveti Nikole